Bhopalwala is a village in Sialkot District, located in the northeast of the Punjab, Pakistan. It is one of the largest villages in the district and is surrounded by agricultural lands.

External links

 Sialkot District Government website

Villages in Sialkot District